Brachyscome nivalis, commonly known as snow daisy, is a  perennial herb in the family Asteraceae and is endemic to Australia. It has mostly white daisy-like flowers, yellow centres and deeply lobed leaves.

Description
The flower bracts are smooth, narrowly lance shaped with jagged edges. Flowering occurs from summer to early autumn, cultivated plants may flower in spring.

Taxonomy
Brachyscome nivalis was first formally described in 1855 by Ferdinand von Mueller and the description was published in Definitions of rare or hitherto undescribed Australian plants.

Distribution and habitat
The snow daisy grows in New South Wales at higher altitudes, and extending south from Mount Gingera in the Australian Capital Territory. In Victoria it is found growing in protected, rocky sites in the alps, sometimes in herb fields, grassland and woodlands.

References

nivalis
Flora of New South Wales
Flora of Victoria (Australia)
Flora of the Australian Capital Territory
Taxa named by Ferdinand von Mueller